Gert Jan Timmerman (born 15 April 1956) is a Dutch chess player, most famous for being the fifteenth ICCF World Champion in correspondence chess, 1996–2002.
Before becoming the fifteenth World Correspondence Champion, Timmerman won Final B of the 5th World Cup between 1987 and 1994.

He tied for second place behind Mikhail Umansky in a "champion of champions" tournament, the ICCF 50 Years World Champion Jubilee. This was a special invitational correspondence tournament involving all living former ICCF World Champions.

References

External links
 
 

1956 births
Living people
World Correspondence Chess Champions
Correspondence chess grandmasters
Dutch chess players
People from Capelle aan den IJssel
20th-century Dutch people